Carl R. Polk (1841–1926) was a farmer, state legislator, and judge in Arkansas. He was born a slave in Arkansas. He represented Jefferson County, Arkansas in the Arkansas House of Representatives in 1871 and 1881.

He was appointed a justice of the peace in 1871. His photograph was included in a composite of Arkansas House members in 1881.

See also
African-American officeholders during and following the Reconstruction era

References

Members of the Arkansas House of Representatives
1841 births
1926 deaths
Date of birth missing
Date of death missing
Place of birth missing
Place of death missing
American justices of the peace